Cloud computing is the on-demand availability of computer system resources, especially data storage (cloud storage) and computing power, without direct active management by the user. Large clouds often have functions distributed over multiple locations, each of which is a data center. Cloud computing relies on sharing of resources to achieve coherence and typically uses a pay-as-you-go model, which can help in reducing capital expenses but may also lead to unexpected operating expenses for users.

Value proposition 
Advocates of public and hybrid clouds claim that cloud computing allows companies to avoid or minimize up-front IT infrastructure costs. Proponents also claim that cloud computing allows enterprises to get their applications up and running faster, with improved manageability and less maintenance, and that it enables IT teams to more rapidly adjust resources to meet fluctuating and unpredictable demand, providing burst computing capability: high computing power at certain periods of peak demand.

Market
According to International Data Corporation (IDC), global spending on cloud computing services has reached $706 billion and expected to reach $1.3 trillion by 2025. While Gartner estimated that global public cloud services end-user spending would reach $600 billion by 2023. As per a McKinsey & Company report, cloud cost-optimization levers and value-oriented business use cases foresee more than $1 trillion in run-rate EBITDA across Fortune 500 companies as up for grabs in 2030. In 2022, more than $1.3 trillion in enterprise IT spending was at stake from the shift to the cloud, growing to almost $1.8 trillion in 2025, according to Gartner.

History

The term cloud was used to refer to platforms for distributed computing as early as 1993, when Apple spin-off General Magic and AT&T used it in describing their (paired) Telescript and Personal Link technologies. In Wired's April 1994 feature "Bill and Andy's Excellent Adventure II", Andy Hertzfeld commented on Telescript, General Magic's distributed programming language:

Early history
During the 1960s, the initial concepts of time-sharing became popularized via Remote Job Entry (RJE); this terminology was mostly associated with large vendors such as IBM and DEC. Full-time-sharing solutions were available by the early 1970s on such platforms as Multics (on GE hardware), Cambridge CTSS, and the earliest UNIX ports (on DEC hardware). Yet, the "data center" model where users submitted jobs to operators to run on IBM mainframes was overwhelmingly predominant.

In the 1990s, telecommunications companies, who previously offered primarily dedicated point-to-point data circuits, began offering virtual private network (VPN) services with comparable quality of service, but at a lower cost. By switching traffic as they saw fit to balance server use, they could use overall network bandwidth more effectively. They began to use the cloud symbol to denote the demarcation point between what the provider was responsible for and what users were responsible for. Cloud computing extended this boundary to cover all servers as well as the network infrastructure. As computers became more diffused, scientists and technologists explored ways to make large-scale computing power available to more users through time-sharing. They experimented with algorithms to optimize the infrastructure, platform, and applications, to prioritize tasks to be executed by CPUs, and to increase efficiency for end users.

The use of the cloud metaphor for virtualized services dates at least to General Magic in 1994, where it was used to describe the universe of "places" that mobile agents in the Telescript environment could go. As described by Andy Hertzfeld:

The use of the cloud metaphor is credited to General Magic communications employee David Hoffman, based on long-standing use in networking and telecom. In addition to use by General Magic itself, it was also used in promoting AT&T's associated Personal Link Services.

2000s
In July 2002, Amazon created the subsidiary Amazon Web Services, to "enable developers to build innovative and entrepreneurial applications on their own." In March 2006 Amazon introduced its Simple Storage Service (S3), followed by Elastic Compute Cloud (EC2) in August of the same year. These products pioneered the usage of server virtualization to deliver IaaS at a cheaper and on-demand pricing basis.

In April 2008, Google released the beta version of the Google App Engine. The App Engine was a PaaS (one of the first of its kind) that provided a fully maintained infrastructure and a deployment platform for users to create web applications using common languages/technologies such as Python, Node.js, and PHP. The goal was to eliminate the need for some administrative tasks typical of an IaaS model, while creating a platform where users could easily deploy such applications and scale them to demand.

In early 2008, NASA's Nebula, enhanced in the RESERVOIR European Commission-funded project, became the first open-source software for deploying private and hybrid clouds, and for the federation of clouds.

By mid-2008, Gartner saw an opportunity for cloud computing "to shape the relationship among consumers of IT services, those who use IT services and those who sell them" and observed that "organizations are switching from company-owned hardware and software assets to per-use service-based models" so that the "projected shift to computing ... will result in dramatic growth in IT products in some areas and significant reductions in other areas."

In 2008, the U.S. National Science Foundation began the Cluster Exploratory program to fund academic research using Google-IBM cluster technology to analyze massive amounts of data.

In 2009, the government of France announced Project Andromède to create a "sovereign cloud" or national cloud computing, with the government to spend €285 million. The initiative failed badly and Cloudwatt was shut down on 1 February 2020.

2010s
In February 2010, Microsoft released Microsoft Azure, which had been announced in October 2008.

In July 2010, Rackspace Hosting and NASA jointly launched an open-source cloud-software initiative known as OpenStack. The OpenStack project intended to help organizations offering cloud-computing services running on standard hardware. The early code came from NASA's Nebula platform as well as from Rackspace's Cloud Files platform. As an open-source offering and along with other open-source solutions such as CloudStack, Ganeti, and OpenNebula, it has attracted attention by several key communities. Several studies aim at comparing these open source offerings based on a set of criteria.

On March 1, 2011, IBM announced the IBM SmartCloud framework to support Smarter Planet. Among the various components of the Smarter Computing foundation, cloud computing is a critical part. On June 7, 2012, Oracle announced the Oracle Cloud.

In May 2012, Google Compute Engine was released in preview, before being rolled out into General Availability in December 2013.

In 2019, Linux was the most common OS used on Microsoft Azure. In December 2019, Amazon announced AWS Outposts, which is a fully managed service that extends AWS infrastructure, AWS services, APIs, and tools to virtually any customer datacenter, co-location space, or on-premises facility for a truly consistent hybrid experience.

Similar concepts

The goal of cloud computing is to allow users to take benefit from all of these technologies, without the need for deep knowledge about or expertise with each one of them. The cloud aims to cut costs and helps the users focus on their core business instead of being impeded by IT obstacles. The main enabling technology for cloud computing is virtualization. Virtualization software separates a physical computing device into one or more "virtual" devices, each of which can be easily used and managed to perform computing tasks. With operating system–level virtualization essentially creating a scalable system of multiple independent computing devices, idle computing resources can be allocated and used more efficiently. Virtualization provides the agility required to speed up IT operations and reduces cost by increasing infrastructure utilization. Autonomic computing automates the process through which the user can provision resources on-demand. By minimizing user involvement, automation speeds up the process, reduces labor costs and reduces the possibility of human errors.

Cloud computing uses concepts from utility computing to provide metrics for the services used. Cloud computing attempts to address QoS (quality of service) and reliability problems of other grid computing models.

Cloud computing shares characteristics with:

 Client–server model  Client–server computing refers broadly to any distributed application that distinguishes between service providers (servers) and service requestors (clients).
 Computer bureau  A service bureau providing computer services, particularly from the 1960s to 1980s.
 Grid computing  A form of distributed and parallel computing, whereby a 'super and virtual computer' is composed of a cluster of networked, loosely coupled computers acting in concert to perform very large tasks.
 Fog computing  Distributed computing paradigm that provides data, compute, storage and application services closer to the client or near-user edge devices, such as network routers. Furthermore, fog computing handles data at the network level, on smart devices and on the end-user client-side (e.g. mobile devices), instead of sending data to a remote location for processing.
 Utility computing  The "packaging of computing resources, such as computation and storage, as a metered service similar to a traditional public utility, such as electricity."
 Peer-to-peer  A distributed architecture without the need for central coordination. Participants are both suppliers and consumers of resources (in contrast to the traditional client-server model).
Cloud sandbox  A live, isolated computer environment in which a program, code or file can run without affecting the application in which it runs.

Characteristics

Cloud computing exhibits the following key characteristics:
 Cost reductions are claimed by cloud providers. A public-cloud delivery model converts capital expenditures (e.g., buying servers) to operational expenditure. This purportedly lowers barriers to entry, as infrastructure is typically provided by a third party and need not be purchased for one-time or infrequent intensive computing tasks. Pricing on a utility computing basis is "fine-grained", with usage-based billing options. As well, less in-house IT skills are required for implementation of projects that use cloud computing. The e-FISCAL project's state-of-the-art repository contains several articles looking into cost aspects in more detail, most of them concluding that costs savings depend on the type of activities supported and the type of infrastructure available in-house.
 Device and location independence enable users to access systems using a web browser regardless of their location or what device they use (e.g., PC, mobile phone). As infrastructure is off-site (typically provided by a third-party) and accessed via the Internet, users can connect to it from anywhere.
 Maintenance of cloud environment is easier because the data is hosted on an outside server maintained by a provider without the need to invest in data center hardware. IT maintenance of cloud computing is managed and updated by the cloud provider's IT maintenance team which reduces cloud computing costs compared with on-premises data centers.  
 Multitenancy enables sharing of resources and costs across a large pool of users thus allowing for:
 centralization of infrastructure in locations with lower costs (such as real estate, electricity, etc.)
 peak-load capacity increases (users need not engineer and pay for the resources and equipment to meet their highest possible load-levels)
 utilization and efficiency improvements for systems that are often only 10–20% utilized.
 Performance is monitored by IT experts from the service provider, and consistent and loosely coupled architectures are constructed using web services as the system interface.
 Productivity may be increased when multiple users can work on the same data simultaneously, rather than waiting for it to be saved and emailed. Time may be saved as information does not need to be re-entered when fields are matched, nor do users need to install application software upgrades to their computer.
 Availability improves with the use of multiple redundant sites, which makes well-designed cloud computing suitable for business continuity and disaster recovery.
 Scalability and elasticity via dynamic ("on-demand") provisioning of resources on a fine-grained, self-service basis in near real-time (Note, the VM startup time varies by VM type, location, OS and cloud providers), without users having to engineer for peak loads. This gives the ability to scale up when the usage need increases or down if resources are not being used. The time-efficient benefit of cloud scalability also means faster time to market, more business flexibility, and adaptability, as adding new resources does not take as much time as it used to. Emerging approaches for managing elasticity include the use of machine learning techniques to propose efficient elasticity models.
 Security can improve due to centralization of data, increased security-focused resources, etc., but concerns can persist about loss of control over certain sensitive data, and the lack of security for stored kernels. Security is often as good as or better than other traditional systems, in part because service providers are able to devote resources to solving security issues that many customers cannot afford to tackle or which they lack the technical skills to address. However, the complexity of security is greatly increased when data is distributed over a wider area or over a greater number of devices, as well as in multi-tenant systems shared by unrelated users. In addition, user access to security audit logs may be difficult or impossible. Private cloud installations are in part motivated by users' desire to retain control over the infrastructure and avoid losing control of information security.

The National Institute of Standards and Technology's definition of cloud computing identifies "five essential characteristics":

Service models

Though service-oriented architecture advocates "Everything as a service" (with the acronyms EaaS or XaaS, or simply aas), cloud-computing providers offer their "services" according to different models, of which the three standard models per NIST are Infrastructure as a Service (IaaS), Platform as a Service (PaaS), and Software as a Service (SaaS). These models offer increasing abstraction; they are thus often portrayed as layers in a stack: infrastructure-, platform- and software-as-a-service, but these need not be related. For example, one can provide SaaS implemented on physical machines (bare metal), without using underlying PaaS or IaaS layers, and conversely one can run a program on IaaS and access it directly, without wrapping it as SaaS.

Infrastructure as a service (IaaS)

"Infrastructure as a service" (IaaS) refers to online services that provide high-level APIs used to abstract various low-level details of underlying network infrastructure like physical computing resources, location, data partitioning, scaling, security, backup, etc. A hypervisor runs the virtual machines as guests. Pools of hypervisors within the cloud operational system can support large numbers of virtual machines and the ability to scale services up and down according to customers' varying requirements. Linux containers run in isolated partitions of a single Linux kernel running directly on the physical hardware. Linux cgroups and namespaces are the underlying Linux kernel technologies used to isolate, secure and manage the containers. Containerisation offers higher performance than virtualization because there is no hypervisor overhead. IaaS clouds often offer additional resources such as a virtual-machine disk-image library, raw block storage, file or object storage, firewalls, load balancers, IP addresses, virtual local area networks (VLANs), and software bundles.

The NIST's definition of cloud computing describes IaaS as "where the consumer is able to deploy and run arbitrary software, which can include operating systems and applications. The consumer does not manage or control the underlying cloud infrastructure but has control over operating systems, storage, and deployed applications; and possibly limited control of select networking components (e.g., host firewalls)."

IaaS-cloud providers supply these resources on-demand from their large pools of equipment installed in data centers. For wide-area connectivity, customers can use either the Internet or carrier clouds (dedicated virtual private networks). To deploy their applications, cloud users install operating-system images and their application software on the cloud infrastructure. In this model, the cloud user patches and maintains the operating systems and the application software. Cloud providers typically bill IaaS services on a utility computing basis: cost reflects the number of resources allocated and consumed.

Platform as a service (PaaS)

The NIST's definition of cloud computing defines Platform as a Service as:

PaaS vendors offer a development environment to application developers. The provider typically develops toolkit and standards for development and channels for distribution and payment. In the PaaS models, cloud providers deliver a computing platform, typically including an operating system, programming-language execution environment, database, and the web server. Application developers develop and run their software on a cloud platform instead of directly buying and managing the underlying hardware and software layers. With some PaaS, the underlying computer and storage resources scale automatically to match application demand so that the cloud user does not have to allocate resources manually.

Some integration and data management providers also use specialized applications of PaaS as delivery models for data. Examples include iPaaS (Integration Platform as a Service) and dPaaS (Data Platform as a Service). iPaaS enables customers to develop, execute and govern integration flows. Under the iPaaS integration model, customers drive the development and deployment of integrations without installing or managing any hardware or middleware. dPaaS delivers integration—and data-management—products as a fully managed service. Under the dPaaS model, the PaaS provider, not the customer, manages the development and execution of programs by building data applications for the customer. dPaaS users access data through data-visualization tools.

Software as a service (SaaS)

The NIST's definition of cloud computing defines Software as a Service as:

In the software as a service (SaaS) model, users gain access to application software and databases. Cloud providers manage the infrastructure and platforms that run the applications. SaaS is sometimes referred to as "on-demand software" and is usually priced on a pay-per-use basis or using a subscription fee. In the SaaS model, cloud providers install and operate application software in the cloud and cloud users access the software from cloud clients. Cloud users do not manage the cloud infrastructure and platform where the application runs. This eliminates the need to install and run the application on the cloud user's own computers, which simplifies maintenance and support. Cloud applications differ from other applications in their scalability—which can be achieved by cloning tasks onto multiple virtual machines at run-time to meet changing work demand. Load balancers distribute the work over the set of virtual machines. This process is transparent to the cloud user, who sees only a single access-point. To accommodate a large number of cloud users, cloud applications can be multitenant, meaning that any machine may serve more than one cloud-user organization.

The pricing model for SaaS applications is typically a monthly or yearly flat fee per user, so prices become scalable and adjustable if users are added or removed at any point. It may also be free. Proponents claim that SaaS gives a business the potential to reduce IT operational costs by outsourcing hardware and software maintenance and support to the cloud provider. This enables the business to reallocate IT operations costs away from hardware/software spending and from personnel expenses, towards meeting other goals. In addition, with applications hosted centrally, updates can be released without the need for users to install new software. One drawback of SaaS comes with storing the users' data on the cloud provider's server. As a result, there could be unauthorized access to the data. Examples of applications offered as SaaS are games and productivity software like Google Docs and Office Online. SaaS applications may be integrated with cloud storage or File hosting services, which is the case with Google Docs being integrated with Google Drive, and Office Online being integrated with OneDrive.

Mobile "backend" as a service (MBaaS)

In the mobile "backend" as a service (m) model, also known as "backend as a service" (BaaS), web app and mobile app developers are provided with a way to link their applications to cloud storage and cloud computing services with application programming interfaces (APIs) exposed to their applications and custom software development kits (SDKs). Services include user management, push notifications, integration with social networking services and more. This is a relatively recent model in cloud computing, with most BaaS startups dating from 2011 or later but trends indicate that these services are gaining significant mainstream traction with enterprise consumers.

Serverless computing or Function-as-a-Service (FaaS)

Serverless computing is a cloud computing code execution model in which the cloud provider fully manages starting and stopping virtual machines as necessary to serve requests, and requests are billed by an abstract measure of the resources required to satisfy the request, rather than per virtual machine, per hour. Despite the name, it does not actually involve running code without servers. Serverless computing is so named because the business or person that owns the system does not have to purchase, rent or provide servers or virtual machines for the back-end code to run on.

Function as a service (FaaS) is a service-hosted remote procedure call that leverages serverless computing to enable the deployment of individual functions in the cloud that run in response to events. FaaS is considered by some to come under the umbrella of serverless computing, while some others use the terms interchangeably.

Deployment models

Private
Private cloud is cloud infrastructure operated solely for a single organization, whether managed internally or by a third party, and hosted either internally or externally. Undertaking a private cloud project requires significant engagement to virtualize the business environment, and requires the organization to reevaluate decisions about existing resources. It can improve business, but every step in the project raises security issues that must be addressed to prevent serious vulnerabilities. Self-run data centers are generally capital intensive. They have a significant physical footprint, requiring allocations of space, hardware, and environmental controls. These assets have to be refreshed periodically, resulting in additional capital expenditures. They have attracted criticism because users "still have to buy, build, and manage them" and thus do not benefit from less hands-on management, essentially "[lacking] the economic model that makes cloud computing such an intriguing concept".

Public

Cloud services are considered "public" when they are delivered over the public Internet, and they may be offered as a paid subscription, or free of charge. Architecturally, there are few differences between public- and private-cloud services, but security concerns increase substantially when services (applications, storage, and other resources) are shared by multiple customers. Most public-cloud providers offer direct-connection services that allow customers to securely link their legacy data centers to their cloud-resident applications.

Several factors like the functionality of the solutions, cost, integrational and organizational aspects as well as safety & security are influencing the decision of enterprises and organizations to choose a public cloud or on-premises solution.

Hybrid

Hybrid cloud is a composition of a public cloud and a private environment, such as a private cloud or on-premises resources, that remain distinct entities but are bound together, offering the benefits of multiple deployment models. Hybrid cloud can also mean the ability to connect collocation, managed and/or dedicated services with cloud resources. Gartner defines a hybrid cloud service as a cloud computing service that is composed of some combination of private, public and community cloud services, from different service providers. A hybrid cloud service crosses isolation and provider boundaries so that it cannot be simply put in one category of private, public, or community cloud service. It allows one to extend either the capacity or the capability of a cloud service, by aggregation, integration or customization with another cloud service.

Varied use cases for hybrid cloud composition exist. For example, an organization may store sensitive client data in house on a private cloud application, but interconnect that application to a business intelligence application provided on a public cloud as a software service. This example of hybrid cloud extends the capabilities of the enterprise to deliver a specific business service through the addition of externally available public cloud services. Hybrid cloud adoption depends on a number of factors such as data security and compliance requirements, level of control needed over data, and the applications an organization uses.

Another example of hybrid cloud is one where IT organizations use public cloud computing resources to meet temporary capacity needs that can not be met by the private cloud. This capability enables hybrid clouds to employ cloud bursting for scaling across clouds. Cloud bursting is an application deployment model in which an application runs in a private cloud or data center and "bursts" to a public cloud when the demand for computing capacity increases. A primary advantage of cloud bursting and a hybrid cloud model is that an organization pays for extra compute resources only when they are needed. Cloud bursting enables data centers to create an in-house IT infrastructure that supports average workloads, and use cloud resources from public or private clouds, during spikes in processing demands. The specialized model of hybrid cloud, which is built atop heterogeneous hardware, is called "Cross-platform Hybrid Cloud". A cross-platform hybrid cloud is usually powered by different CPU architectures, for example, x86-64 and ARM, underneath. Users can transparently deploy and scale applications without knowledge of the cloud's hardware diversity. This kind of cloud emerges from the rise of ARM-based system-on-chip for server-class computing.

Hybrid cloud infrastructure essentially serves to eliminate limitations inherent to the multi-access relay characteristics of private cloud networking. The advantages include enhanced runtime flexibility and adaptive memory processing unique to virtualized interface models.

Others

Community
Community cloud shares infrastructure between several organizations from a specific community with common concerns (security, compliance, jurisdiction, etc.), whether managed internally or by a third-party, and either hosted internally or externally. The costs are spread over fewer users than a public cloud (but more than a private cloud), so only some of the cost savings potential of cloud computing are realized.

Distributed
A cloud computing platform can be assembled from a distributed set of machines in different locations, connected to a single network or hub service. It is possible to distinguish between two types of distributed clouds: public-resource computing and volunteer cloud.

 Public-resource computing  This type of distributed cloud results from an expansive definition of cloud computing, because they are more akin to distributed computing than cloud computing. Nonetheless, it is considered a sub-class of cloud computing. 
 Volunteer cloud  Volunteer cloud computing is characterized as the intersection of public-resource computing and cloud computing, where a cloud computing infrastructure is built using volunteered resources. Many challenges arise from this type of infrastructure, because of the volatility of the resources used to build it and the dynamic environment it operates in. It can also be called peer-to-peer clouds, or ad-hoc clouds. An interesting effort in such direction is Cloud@Home, it aims to implement a cloud computing infrastructure using volunteered resources providing a business-model to incentivize contributions through financial restitution.

Multi

Multicloud is the use of multiple cloud computing services in a single heterogeneous architecture to reduce reliance on single vendors, increase flexibility through choice, mitigate against disasters, etc. It differs from hybrid cloud in that it refers to multiple cloud services, rather than multiple deployment modes (public, private, legacy).

Poly 
Poly cloud refers to the use of multiple public clouds for the purpose of leveraging specific services that each provider offers. It differs from Multi cloud in that it is not designed to increase flexibility or mitigate against failures but is rather used to allow an organization to achieve more that could be done with a single provider.

Big data
The issues of transferring large amounts of data to the cloud as well as data security once the data is in the cloud initially hampered adoption of cloud for big data, but now that much data originates in the cloud and with the advent of bare-metal servers, the cloud has become a solution for use cases including business analytics and geospatial analysis.

HPC
HPC cloud refers to the use of cloud computing services and infrastructure to execute high-performance computing (HPC) applications. These applications consume a considerable amount of computing power and memory and are traditionally executed on clusters of computers. In 2016 a handful of companies, including R-HPC, Amazon Web Services, Univa, Silicon Graphics International, Sabalcore, Gomput, and Penguin Computing offered a high-performance computing cloud. The Penguin On Demand (POD) cloud was one of the first non-virtualized remote HPC services offered on a pay-as-you-go basis. Penguin Computing launched its HPC cloud in 2016 as an alternative to Amazon's EC2 Elastic Compute Cloud, which uses virtualized computing nodes.

Architecture

Cloud architecture, the systems architecture of the software systems involved in the delivery of cloud computing, typically involves multiple cloud components communicating with each other over a loose coupling mechanism such as a messaging queue. Elastic provision implies intelligence in the use of tight or loose coupling as applied to mechanisms such as these and others.

Cloud engineering
Cloud engineering is the application of engineering disciplines of cloud computing. It brings a systematic approach to the high-level concerns of commercialization, standardization and governance in conceiving, developing, operating and maintaining cloud computing systems. It is a multidisciplinary method encompassing contributions from diverse areas such as systems, software, web, performance, information technology engineering, security, platform, risk, and quality engineering.

Security and privacy

Cloud computing poses privacy concerns because the service provider can access the data that is in the cloud at any time.  It could accidentally or deliberately alter or delete information. Many cloud providers can share information with third parties if necessary for purposes of law and order without a warrant. That is permitted in their privacy policies, which users must agree to before they start using cloud services. Solutions to privacy include policy and legislation as well as end-users' choices for how data is stored. Users can encrypt data that is processed or stored within the cloud to prevent unauthorized access. Identity management systems can also provide practical solutions to privacy concerns in cloud computing. These systems distinguish between authorized and unauthorized users and determine the amount of data that is accessible to each entity. The systems work by creating and describing identities, recording activities, and getting rid of unused identities.

According to the Cloud Security Alliance, the top three threats in the cloud are Insecure Interfaces and APIs, Data Loss & Leakage, and Hardware Failure—which accounted for 29%, 25% and 10% of all cloud security outages respectively. Together, these form shared technology vulnerabilities. In a cloud provider platform being shared by different users, there may be a possibility that information belonging to different customers resides on the same data server. Additionally, Eugene Schultz, chief technology officer at Emagined Security, said that hackers are spending substantial time and effort looking for ways to penetrate the cloud. "There are some real Achilles' heels in the cloud infrastructure that are making big holes for the bad guys to get into". Because data from hundreds or thousands of companies can be stored on large cloud servers, hackers can theoretically gain control of huge stores of information through a single attack—a process he called "hyperjacking". Some examples of this include the Dropbox security breach, and iCloud 2014 leak. Dropbox had been breached in October 2014, having over 7 million of its users passwords stolen by hackers in an effort to get monetary value from it by Bitcoins (BTC). By having these passwords, they are able to read private data as well as have this data be indexed by search engines (making the information public).

There is the problem of legal ownership of the data (If a user stores some data in the cloud, can the cloud provider profit from it?). Many Terms of Service agreements are silent on the question of ownership. Physical control of the computer equipment (private cloud) is more secure than having the equipment off-site and under someone else's control (public cloud). This delivers great incentive to public cloud computing service providers to prioritize building and maintaining strong management of secure services. Some small businesses that don't have expertise in IT security could find that it's more secure for them to use a public cloud. There is the risk that end users do not understand the issues involved when signing on to a cloud service (persons sometimes don't read the many pages of the terms of service agreement, and just click "Accept" without reading). This is important now that cloud computing is common and required for some services to work, for example for an intelligent personal assistant (Apple's Siri or Google Assistant). Fundamentally, private cloud is seen as more secure with higher levels of control for the owner, however public cloud is seen to be more flexible and requires less time and money investment from the user.

Limitations and disadvantages
According to Bruce Schneier, "The downside is that you will have limited customization options. Cloud computing is cheaper because of economics of scale, and—like any outsourced task—you tend to get what you get. A restaurant with a limited menu is cheaper than a personal chef who can cook anything you want. Fewer options at a much cheaper price: it's a feature, not a bug." He also suggests that "the cloud provider might not meet your legal needs" and that businesses need to weigh the benefits of cloud computing against the risks.
In cloud computing, the control of the back end infrastructure is limited to the cloud vendor only. Cloud providers often decide on the management policies, which moderates what the cloud users are able to do with their deployment. Cloud users are also limited to the control and management of their applications, data and services. This includes data caps, which are placed on cloud users by the cloud vendor allocating a certain amount of bandwidth for each customer and are often shared among other cloud users.

Privacy and confidentiality are big concerns in some activities. For instance, sworn translators working under the stipulations of an NDA, might face problems regarding sensitive data that are not encrypted. Due to the use of the internet, confidential information such as employee data and user data can be easily available to third-party organisations and people in Cloud Computing.

Cloud computing has some limitations for smaller business operations, particularly regarding security and downtime. Technical outages are inevitable and occur sometimes when cloud service providers (CSPs) become overwhelmed in the process of serving their clients. This may result in temporary business suspension. Since this technology's systems rely on the Internet, an individual cannot access their applications, server, or data from the cloud during an outage.

Emerging trends

Cloud computing is still a subject of research. A driving factor in the evolution of cloud computing has been chief technology officers seeking to minimize risk of internal outages and mitigate the complexity of housing network and computing hardware in-house. They are also looking to share information to workers located in diverse areas in near and real-time, to enable teams to work seamlessly, no matter where they are located. Since the global pandemic of 2020, cloud technology jumped ahead in popularity due to the level of security of data and the flexibility of working options for all employees, notably remote workers. For example, Zoom grew over 160% in 2020 alone.

Digital forensics in the cloud
The issue of carrying out investigations where the cloud storage devices cannot be physically accessed has generated a number of changes to the way that digital evidence is located and collected. New process models have been developed to formalize collection.

In some scenarios existing digital forensics tools can be employed to access cloud storage as networked drives (although this is a slow process generating a large amount of internet traffic).

An alternative approach is to deploy a tool that processes in the cloud itself.

For organizations using Office 365 with an 'E5' subscription, there is the option to use Microsoft's built-in e-discovery resources, although these do not provide all the functionality that is typically required for a forensic process.

See also

 Block-level storage
 :Category:Cloud computing providers
 :Category:Cloud platforms
 Communication protocol
 Communications system
 Cloud collaboration
 Cloud native computing
 Cloud-native processor
 Cloud computing security
 Cloud computing comparison
 Cloud management
 Cloud research
 Cloud robotics
 Cloud gaming
 Cloud storage
 Cloudlet
 Computer cluster
 Cooperative storage cloud
 Dew computing
 Data cluster
 Directory
 Distributed data store
 Distributed database
 Distributed computing
 Distributed networking
 Decentralized computing
 Edge computing
 Edge device
 eScience
 File system
 Clustered file system
 Distributed file system
 Distributed file system for cloud
 Fog computing
 Fog robotics
 Green computing (environmentally sustainable computing)
 Grid computing
 In-memory database
 In-memory processing
 Internet of things
 Microservices
 Mobile cloud computing
 Mobile edge computing
 Peer-to-peer
 Personal cloud
 Robot as a service
 As a service
 Service-oriented architecture
 Time-sharing
 Ubiquitous computing
 VDI
 Virtual private cloud
 Web computing

References

Further reading
 
 Weisser, Alexander (2020). International Taxation of Cloud Computing. Editions Juridiques Libres, ISBN 978-2-88954-030-3. 
 
 
 
 Mell, P. (2011, September 31). The NIST Definition of Cloud Computing. Retrieved November 1, 2015, from National Institute of Standards and Technology website

External links

 
Cloud infrastructure